My Sumaya is the third studio album by Muslim Belal, released on 19 May 2015 by Halal Dawa Records.

Release
The album was released on 19 May 2015. It is a charity album with all the proceeds going towards feeding the most vulnerable children in Eastern Sudan.

Track listing

References

External links

2015 albums
Arabic-language albums
Charity albums
Muslim Belal albums